Ruhollâh Xâleqi (born 1906 in Kerman, Iran – 12 November 1965 in Salzburg, Austria), also spelled as Khaleqi, was a prominent Iranian musician, composer, conductor and author.

He was the father of the first Persian women conductor Golnuš Xâleqi.

Education
Ruhollâh Khâleghi was born in Mahan, a small town near Kerman, in a musically minded family. He first became acquainted with the tar, but later started to learn to play the violin. As soon as Ali-Naqi Vaziri established his School of Music, Khâleghi left school and joined Vaziri's school, where he studied for eight years. Soon he became his master's assistant and was placed in charge of teaching music theory. He later continued his education and obtained a BA degree in Persian Language and Literature from the University of Tehran.

Career

In 1944 Khāleghi established the National Music Society and in 1949, thanks to the efforts of this great artist, the School of National Music was founded. After his first journey to the former U.S.S.R. in 1955, he became involved in the Iran-Soviet Society and was selected as a member of its board of directors.

He also began to serve as the director of the Payām-e-Novin Magazine. His work, The History of Persian Music, which was published in two volumes, took shape during these years. His other published works include: Harmony of Western Music, Theory of Eastern Music, and Theory of Persian Music.

For many years Khāleghi worked as a musical advisor for Radio Iran and was one of the founders of the program known as Gol'hā (Flowers). He also conducted the Gol'hā Orchestra, for which he composed many pieces and revised the original compositions of his contemporaries as well as older masters, such as Āref and Sheydā. Although revised, the compositions retained all their original characteristics.

Khāleghi's compositions are not limited to what he wrote for Gol'hā. In addition to such masterpieces as Mey-e Nāb (Pure Wine), Āh-e Sahar (Sigh at Dawn), Hālā Cherā (Why Now?), and Chang-e Rudaki (Rudaki's Harp), he composed many other lyrical pieces and hymns, which were mostly patriotic. These include such works as Ey Iran (see Gholām-Hossein Banān) and the Hymn for Azarbaijan. Khāleghi established The National Music Society and Persian National Music Conservatory in 1949 in Tehran.

He believed Persian classical music must turn into a polyphonic music to become more attractive.

He died in 1965 in Salzburg, Austria and was buried in Zahir o-dowleh cemetery, Darband, Tehran.

See also
 Music of Iran
 List of Iranian musicians
List of Iranian composers

References

External links

Ruhollah Khaleghi Artistic Center / Kanun-e  Honari-e Rouhollah Khaleghi
 Listen to some editions of the Golha program from Ostād Javād Ma'roufi's Official Website

1906 births
1965 deaths
Iranian composers
Iranian conductors (music)
Iranian tar players
Iranian violinists
Music educators
Iranian writers about music
People from Kerman Province
Persian classical musicians
20th-century conductors (music)
20th-century violinists
20th-century composers
Iranian music historians
20th-century Iranian people